The Norse exploration of North America began in the late 10th century, when Norsemen explored areas of the North Atlantic colonizing Greenland and creating a short term settlement near the northern tip of Newfoundland. This is known now as L'Anse aux Meadows where the remains of buildings were found in 1960 dating to approximately 1,000 years ago. This discovery helped reignite archaeological exploration for the Norse in the North Atlantic. This single settlement, located on the island of Newfoundland and not on the North American mainland, was abruptly abandoned.
 
The Norse settlements on Greenland lasted for almost 500 years. L'Anse aux Meadows, the only confirmed Norse site in present-day Canada, was small and did not last as long. Other such Norse voyages are likely to have occurred for some time, but there is no evidence of any Norse settlement on mainland North America lasting beyond the 11th century.
 
The Norse exploration of North America has been subject to numerous controversies concerning the European exploration and settlement of North America. Pseudoscientific and pseudo-historical theories have emerged since the public acknowledgment of these Norse expeditions and settlements.

Norse Greenland

According to the Sagas of Icelanders, Norsemen from Iceland first settled Greenland in the 980s. There is no special reason to doubt the authority of the information that the sagas supply regarding the very beginning of the settlement, but they cannot be treated as primary evidence for the history of Norse Greenland because they embody the literary preoccupations of writers and audiences in medieval Iceland that are not always reliable.
 
Erik the Red (Old Norse: Eiríkr rauði), having been banished from Iceland for manslaughter, explored the uninhabited southwestern coast of Greenland during the three years of his banishment.  He made plans to entice settlers to the area, naming it Greenland on the assumption that "people would be more eager to go there because the land had a good name". The inner reaches of one long fjord, named Eiriksfjord after him, was where he eventually established his estate Brattahlid.  He issued tracts of land to his followers.
 

Norse Greenland consisted of two settlements. The Eastern was at the southwestern tip of Greenland, while the Western Settlement was about 500 km up the west coast, inland from present-day Nuuk. A smaller settlement near the Eastern Settlement is sometimes considered the Middle Settlement. The combined population was around 2,000–3,000. At least 400 farms have been identified by archaeologists. Norse Greenland had a bishopric (at Garðar) and exported walrus ivory, furs, rope, sheep, whale and seal blubber, live animals such as polar bears, supposed "unicorn horns" (in reality narwhal tusks), and cattle hides. In 1126, the population requested a bishop (headquartered at Garðar), and in 1261, they accepted the overlordship of the Norwegian king. They continued to have their own law and became almost completely politically independent after 1349, the time of the Black Death. In 1380, the Kingdom of Norway entered into a personal union with the Kingdom of Denmark.

Western trade and decline
The Norse would have encountered both Native Americans (the Beothuk, related to the Algonquin) and the Thule, the ancestors of the Inuit. The Dorset had withdrawn from Greenland before the Norse settlement of the island. Items such as comb fragments, pieces of iron cooking utensils and chisels, chess pieces, ship rivets, carpenter's planes, and oaken ship fragments used in Inuit boats have been found far beyond the traditional range of Norse colonization. A small ivory statue that appears to represent a European has also been found among the ruins of an Inuit community house.

The settlements began to decline in the 14th century. The Western Settlement was abandoned around 1350, and the last bishop at Garðar died in 1377. After a marriage was recorded in 1408, no written records mention the settlers. It is probable that the Eastern Settlement was defunct by the late 15th century. The most recent radiocarbon date found in Norse settlements as of 2002 was 1430 (±15 years). Several theories have been advanced to explain the decline.
 
The Little Ice Age of this period would have made travel between Greenland and Europe, as well as farming, more difficult; although seal and other hunting provided a healthy diet, there was more prestige in cattle farming, and there was increased availability of farms in Scandinavian countries depopulated by famine and plague epidemics. In addition, Greenlandic ivory may have been supplanted in European markets by cheaper ivory from Africa. Despite the loss of contact with the Greenlanders, the Norwegian-Danish crown continued to consider Greenland a possession.
 
Not knowing whether the old Norse civilization remained in Greenland or not—and worried that if it did, it would still be Catholic 200 years after the Scandinavian homelands had experienced the Reformation—a joint merchant-clerical expedition led by the Norwegian missionary Hans Egede was sent to Greenland in 1721. Though this expedition found no surviving Europeans, it marked the beginning of Denmark's re-assertion of sovereignty over the island.

Climate and Norse Greenland 
Norse Greenlanders were limited to scattered fjords on the island that provided a spot for their animals (such as cattle, sheep, goats, dogs, and cats) to be kept and farms to be established. In these fjords, the farms depended upon stables (byres) to host their livestock in the winter, and routinely culled their herds so that they could survive the season. The coming warmer seasons meant that livestock were taken from their byres to pasture, the most fertile being controlled by the most powerful farms and the church. What was produced by livestock and farming was supplemented with subsistence hunting of mainly seal and caribou as well as walrus for trade. The Norse mainly relied on the Nordrsetur hunt, a communal hunt of migratory harp seals that would take place during spring.
 
Trade was highly important to the Greenland Norse and they relied on imports of lumber due to the barrenness of Greenland. In turn they exported goods such as walrus ivory and hide, live polar bears, and narwhal tusks. Ultimately these setups were vulnerable as they relied on migratory patterns created by climate as well as the viability of the few fjords on the island. A portion of the time the Greenland settlements existed was during the Little Ice Age and the climate was, overall, becoming cooler and more humid. As climate began to cool and humidity began to increase, this brought more storms, longer winters and shorter springs, and affected the migratory patterns of the harp seal. Pasture space began to dwindle and fodder yields for the winter became much smaller. This combined with regular herd culling made it hard to maintain livestock, especially for the poorest of the Greenland Norse. Closer to the Eastern Settlement, temperatures remained stable but a prolonged drought reduced fodder production. In spring, the voyages to where migratory harp seals could be found became more dangerous due to more frequent storms, and the lower population of harp seals meant that Nordrsetur hunts became less successful, making subsistence hunting extremely difficult. The strain on resources made trade difficult, and as time went on, Greenland exports lost value in the European market due to competing countries and the lack of interest in what was being traded. Trade in elephant ivory began competing with the trade in walrus tusks that provided income to Greenland, and there is evidence that walrus over-hunting, particularly of the males with larger tusks, led to walrus population declines.
 
In addition, it seemed that the Norse were unwilling to integrate with the Thule people of Greenland, either through marriage or culture. There is evidence of contact as seen through the Thule archaeological record including ivory depictions of the Norse as well as bronze and steel artifacts. However, there is essentially no material evidence of the Thule among Norse artifacts. In older research it was posited that it was not climate change alone that led to Norse decline, but also their unwillingness to adapt. For example, if the Norse had decided to focus their subsistence hunting on the ringed seal (which could be hunted year round, though individually), and decided to reduce or do away with their communal hunts, food would have been much less scarce during the winter season. Also, had Norse individuals used skin instead of wool to produce their clothing, they would have been able to fare better nearer to the coast, and wouldn't have been as confined to the fjords.
 
However, more recent research has shown that the Norse did try to adapt in their own ways. Some of these attempts included increased subsistence hunting. A significant number of bones of marine animals can be found at the settlements, suggesting increased hunting with the absence of farmed food. In addition, pollen records show that the Norse didn't always devastate the small forests and foliage as previously thought. Instead the Norse ensured that overgrazed or overused sections were given time to regrow and moved to other areas. Norse farmers also attempted to adapt. With the increased need for winter fodder and smaller pastures, they would self-fertilize their lands in an attempt to keep up with the new demands caused by the changing climate. However, even with these attempts, climate change was not the only thing putting pressure on the Greenland Norse. The economy was changing, and the exports they relied on were losing value. Current research suggests that the Norse were unable to maintain their settlements because of economic and climatic change happening at the same time.

Vinland

 

 
According to the Icelandic sagasSaga of Erik the Red, plus chapters of the Hauksbók and the Flatey Bookthe Norse started to explore lands to the west of Greenland only a few years after the Greenland settlements were established. In 985, while sailing from Iceland to Greenland with a migration fleet consisting of 400–700 settlers and 25 other ships (14 of which completed the journey), a merchant named Bjarni Herjólfsson was blown off course, and after three days' sailing he sighted land west of the fleet. Bjarni was only interested in finding his father's farm, but he described his findings to Leif Erikson who explored the area in more detail and planted a small settlement fifteen years later.
 
The sagas describe three separate areas that were explored: Helluland, which means "land of the flat stones"; Markland, "the land of forests", definitely of interest to settlers in Greenland where there were few trees; and Vinland, "the land of wine", found somewhere south of Markland. It was in Vinland that the settlement described in the sagas was founded.
 
Markland was first mentioned in the Mediterranean area in 1345 by the Milanese friar Galvaneus Flamma. He probably derived it from oral sources in Genoa.

Leif's winter camp

Using the routes, landmarks, currents, rocks, and winds that Bjarni had described to him, Leif sailed from Greenland westward across the Labrador Sea, with a crew of 35—sailing the same knarr Bjarni had used to make the voyage. He described Helluland as "level and wooded, with broad white beaches wherever they went and a gently sloping shoreline." Leif and others had wanted his father, Erik the Red, to lead this expedition and talked him into it.  However, as Erik attempted to join his son Leif on the voyage towards these new lands, he fell off his horse as it slipped on the wet rocks near the shore; thus he was injured and stayed behind.
 
Sometime around AD 1000, Leif spent the winter, probably near Cape Bauld on the northern tip of Newfoundland, where one day his foster father Tyrker was found drunk, on what the saga describes as "wine-berries." Squashberries, gooseberries, and cranberries all grew wild in the area. There are varying explanations for Leif apparently describing fermented berries as "wine."
 
Leif spent another winter at "Leifsbudir" without conflict, and sailed back to Brattahlíð in Greenland to assume filial duties to his father.

Thorvald's voyage
A couple years later, Leif's brother Thorvald Eiriksson sailed with a crew of 30 men to Vinland and spent the following winter at Leif's camp. In the spring, Thorvald attacked nine of the native people who were sleeping under three skin-covered canoes. The ninth victim escaped and soon came back to the Norse camp with a force. Thorvald was killed by an arrow that succeeded in passing through the barricade. Although brief hostilities ensued, the Norse explorers stayed another winter and left the following spring. Subsequently, another of Leif's brothers, Thorstein, sailed to the New World to retrieve his dead brother's body, but he died before leaving Greenland.

Karlsefni's expedition
A few years later, Thorfinn Karlsefni, also known as "Thorfinn the Valiant", supplied three ships with livestock and 160 men and women (although another source sets the number of settlers at 250). After a cruel winter, he headed south and landed at Straumfjörð. He later moved to Straumsöy, possibly because the current was stronger there.  A sign of peaceful relations between the indigenous peoples and the Norsemen is noted here. The two sides bartered with furs and gray squirrel skins for milk and red cloth, which the natives tied around their heads as a sort of headdress.
 
There are conflicting stories but one account states that a bull belonging to Karlsefni came storming out of the wood, so frightening the natives that they ran to their skin-boats and rowed away.  They returned three days later, in force. The natives used catapults, hoisting "a large sphere on a pole; it was dark blue in color" and about "the size of a sheep's stomach", which flew over the heads of the men and "made an ugly din when it struck the ground".
 
The Norsemen retreated.  Leif Erikson's half-sister Freydís Eiríksdóttir was pregnant and unable to keep up with the retreating Norsemen. She called out to them to stop fleeing from "such pitiful wretches", adding that if she had weapons, she could do better than that. Freydís seized the sword belonging to a man who had been killed by the natives. She pulled one of her breasts out of her bodice and slapped it with the sword, frightening the natives, who fled.

Historiography

For centuries it remained unclear whether the Icelandic stories represented real voyages by the Norse to North America. Although the idea of Norse voyages to, and a colony in, North America was discussed by Swiss scholar Paul Henri Mallet in his book Northern Antiquities (English translation 1770), the sagas first gained widespread attention in 1837 when the Danish antiquarian Carl Christian Rafn revived the idea of a Viking presence in North America. North America, by the name Winland, first appeared in written sources in a work by Adam of Bremen from approximately 1075. The most important works about North America and the early Norse activities there, namely the Sagas of Icelanders, were recorded in the 13th and 14th centuries. In 1420, some Inuit captives and their kayaks were taken to Scandinavia. The Norse sites were depicted in the Skálholt Map, made by an Icelandic teacher in 1570 and depicting part of northeastern North America and mentioning Helluland, Markland and Vinland.
 

Evidence of the Norse west of Greenland came in the 1960s when archaeologist Anne Stine Ingstad and her husband, outdoorsman and author Helge Ingstad, excavated a Norse site at L'Anse aux Meadows in Newfoundland. They found a bronze, ring-headed pin like those the Norse used to fasten their cloaks inside the cooking pit of one of the larger dwellings. A stone oil lamp and a small spindle whorl, used as the flywheel of a handheld spindle, were found inside another building. A fragment of a bone needle believed to have been used for knitting was discovered in the firepit of a third dwelling. A small, decorated brass fragment, once gilded, was also discovered. Much slag formed as a by-product from the smelting and working of iron was found on the site along with many iron boat nails or rivets.
 
In 2012 Canadian researchers identified possible signs of Norse outposts in Nanook at Tanfield Valley on Baffin Island, as well as on Nunguvik, Willows Island, and Avayalik. Unusual fabric cordage found on Baffin Island in the 1980s and stored at the Canadian Museum of Civilization was identified in 1999 as possibly of Norse manufacture; that discovery led to more comprehensive exploration of the Tanfield Valley archaeological site for points of contact between Norse Greenlanders and the indigenous Dorset people.
 

In 2021 some wood from L'Anse aux Meadows that was chopped by an axe was dated to 1021, thus providing for the first time a certain date with regard to the Norse presence at the site.

Pseudohistory
Purported runestones have been found in North America, most famously the Kensington Runestone. These are generally considered forgeries or misinterpretations of Native American petroglyphs. There are many claims of Norse colonization in New England, none well founded.

Gordon Campbell's book Norse America, published in 2021,  develops his thesis that the "fleeting and ill-documented" idea that Vikings "discovered America" quickly seduced Americans of northern European Protestant descent, some of whom went on to deliberately manufacture evidence to support it. There is no generally accepted evidence of a Norse presence in North America except for the far east of Canada, with many so-called discoveries, mostly in the United States, being deliberately falsified or historically baseless, with the goal to promote a political agenda.
 
Monuments claimed to be Norse include:
 Stone Tower in Newport, Rhode Island
 Viking Altar Rock
 Spirit Pond runestones
 AVM Runestone
 Hammer of Thor (monument)
 Bourne stone
 Narragansett Runestone
 Maine penny
 Ulen sword
 Beardmore Relics
 Oklahoma runestones
 The petroglyphs on Dighton Rock, from the Taunton River in Massachusetts

Kensington Runestone 

In late 1898 Swedish immigrant Olof Öhman stated that he found this rune in Kensington, Minnesota, while clearing land he had recently acquired. He stated that the rune was lying face down and tangled in various roots near the crest of a small knoll within an area of wetlands. After Olaus J. Breda (1853–1916), professor of Scandinavian Languages and Literature in the Scandinavian Department at the University of Minnesota analyzed the inscriptions, he declared the rune-stone to be a forgery and published a discrediting article in Symra in 1910. Breda also forwarded copies of the inscription to various contemporary Scandinavian linguists and historians, such as Oluf Rygh, Sophus Bugge, Gustav Storm, Magnus Olsen and Adolf Noreen. They "unanimously pronounced the Kensington inscription a fraud and forgery of recent date".

Horsford's Norumbega

The nineteenth-century Harvard chemist Eben Norton Horsford connected the Charles River Basin to places described in the Norse sagas and elsewhere, notably Norumbega. He published several books on the topic and had plaques, monuments, and statues erected in honor of the Norse. His work received little support from mainstream historians and archeologists at the time, and even less today.
 
Other nineteenth-century writers, such as Horsford's friend Thomas Gold Appleton, in his A Sheaf of Papers (1875), and George Perkins Marsh, in his The Goths in New England, seized upon such false notions of Viking expansion history also to promote the superiority of white people (as well as to oppose the Catholic Church). Such misuse of Viking history and imagery reemerged in the twentieth century among some groups promoting white supremacy.

Vinland Map 
During the mid-1960's Yale University announced the acquisition of a map purportedly drawn around 1440 that showed Vinland and a legend concerning Norse voyages to the region. However certain experts doubted the authenticity of the map, based on linguistic and cartographic inconsistencies. Chemical analysis of the map's ink later shed further doubts on its authenticity. Scientific debate continued until in 2021 the university finally acknowledged that the Vinland Map is a forgery.

Misattributed archeological findings 
Archeological findings in 2015 at Point Rosee, on the southwest coast of Newfoundland, were originally thought to reveal evidence of a turf wall and the roasting of bog iron ore, and therefore a possible 10th century Norse settlement in Canada. Findings from the 2016 excavation suggest the turf wall and the roasted bog iron ore discovered in 2015 were the result of natural processes. The possible settlement was initially discovered through satellite imagery in 2014, and archaeologists excavated the area in 2015 and 2016. Birgitta Linderoth Wallace, one of the leading experts of Norse archaeology in North America and an expert on the Norse site at L'Anse aux Meadows, is unsure of the identification of Point Rosee as a Norse site. Archaeologist Karen Milek was a member of the 2016 Point Rosee excavation and is a Norse expert. She also expressed doubt that Point Rosee was a Norse site as there are no good landing sites for their boats and there are steep cliffs between the shoreline and the excavation site. In their 8 November 2017, report Sarah Parcak and Gregory Mumford, co-directors of the excavation, wrote that they "found no evidence whatsoever for either a Norse presence or human activity at Point Rosee prior to the historic period" and that "none of the team members, including the Norse specialists, deemed this area as having any traces of human activity."

Duration of Norse contact
Settlements in continental North America aimed to exploit natural resources such as furs and in particular lumber, which was in short supply in Greenland. It is unclear why the short-term settlements did not become permanent, though it was likely in part because of hostile relations with the indigenous peoples, referred to as the Skræling by the Norse. Nevertheless, it appears that sporadic voyages to Markland for forages, timber, and trade with the locals could have lasted as long as 400 years.
 
James Watson Curran writes:From 985 to 1410, Greenland was in touch with the world. Then silence. In 1492 the Vatican noted that no news of that country "at the end of the world" had been received for 80 years, and the bishopric of the colony was offered to a certain ecclesiastic if he would go and "restore Christianity" there. He didn't go.

See also
Pre-Columbian trans-oceanic contact theories
Vestri Obygdir
History of Greenland
History of Nunavut
History of Newfoundland
Danish-Norwegian colonization of the Americas
Leif Erikson Day
Akilineq
Waquoit Bay
Wonderstrands
Vinland flag
White Amazonian Indians

References

External links

 L'Anse aux Meadows National Historic Site, Parks Canada website
 The Norse in the North Atlantic, Newfoundland and Labrador Heritage website
 Freda Harold Research Papers at Dartmouth College Library

 

 
Populated places established in the 10th century
10th century in North America
15th century in North America